Raffaelli is a surname. Notable people with the surname include:

Cyril Raffaelli, French traceur, martial artist and stuntman
Esuperanzio Raffaelli (died 1668), Roman Catholic prelate who served as Bishop of Penne e Atri 
Giacomo Raffaelli, Italian mosaicist from Rome
Giacomo Raffaelli (volleyball) (born 1995), Italian male volleyball player
Jean-François Raffaëlli, French realist painter, sculptor, and printmaker who exhibited with the Impressionists
John D. Raffaelli, American lobbyist born in Texarkana
Philip Raffaelli, British general practitioner and Royal Naval Medical Officer
Ron Raffaelli, American photographer
Darin Raffaelli, guitarist, formerly of the band Supercharger

Italian-language surnames
Surnames of South Tyrolean origin